John C. Smith may refer to:

 John C. Smith (politician) (1832–1910), American politician
 John Campbell Smith (1828–1914), Scottish writer
 John Chaloner Smith (1827–1895), Irish engineer
 John Christopher Smith (1712–1795), English composer
 John Cotton Smith (1765–1845), American lawyer
 John Cyril Smith (1922–2003), British legal scholar
 John C. Smith (war correspondent), see New York Herald Tribune